Rech is a municipality in the district of Ahrweiler, in Rhineland-Palatinate, Germany. It is situated in the Ahr valley.

References

Ahrweiler (district)